Gmelinol is a lignan. (+)-Gmelinol can be isolated from the heartwood of Gmelina arborea. This compound, along with four other chemicals also found in the same species, (+)-7′-O-ethyl arboreol, (+)-paulownin, (+)-epieudesmin and (−)-β-sitosterol, shows antifungal activity against Trametes versicolor.

References 

Lignans